Maná is a rural barrio in the municipality of Corozal, Puerto Rico. Its population in 2010 was 2,093.

Features and demographics
Maná has  of land area and no water area.

Sectors
Barrios (which are like minor civil divisions) in turn are further subdivided into smaller local populated place areas/units called sectores (sectors in English). The types of sectores may vary, from normally sector to urbanización to reparto to barriada to residencial, among others.

The following sectors are in Maná barrio:

Features
PR-802 is the main east–west road through Maná.

See also

 List of communities in Puerto Rico
 List of barrios and sectors of Corozal, Puerto Rico

References

External links

 

Barrios of Corozal, Puerto Rico